Basel Rajoub is a Syrian-Swiss saxophone player. An Aleppo-born and Switzland-based graduate of the High Institute of Music in Damascus, Rajoub is known for developing oriental music for the saxophone. He performs as a solo artist and leader of the Basel Rajoub Ensemble.

Soriana Project 
Soriana Project Contemporary Music from the Orient is a body of musical works by Syrian composer and instrumentalist Basel Rajoub. The project features collaborations with like-minded artists celebrating their heritage and paying homage to the gift of musical knowledge.

"Soriana is 'our Syria'. A homeland we left behind, forced out either by a search or by circumstances. We head out thinking that we carry no baggage, completely unaware of the biggest gift our country has bestowed upon us. That gift is the gift of musical knowledge. It remains with me throughout many journeys, it soothes wounds and inspires creation, provides warmth and a platform of stability, images, aromas, tastes that water the mouth and inspire new creations still. This music is my gift to our Syria – Soriana."

Concerts 
 2014-01-29 UK/London Brunei Gallery Lecture Theatre
 2014-02-08 France/Chamonix Cosmo Jazz Festival
 2014-04-08 Italy/Quarna sotto Quarna un paese per la musica
 2014-04-10 Switzerland/Geneva Dans Le Cadre Du Festival Jazzcontreband
 2014-05-10 Austria/Vienna MuTh - Musik und Theater
 2014-09-04 Switzerland Cully Jazz Festival
 2015-01-05 Switzerland/Martigny Caves du Manoir
 2015-02-05 Switzerland Biel Théâtre de Poche
 2015-03-27 Switzerland/Geneva AMR Jazz Festival
 2015-11-20 UK/London - London Jazz Festival
 2016-01-10 Germany/Berlin Radialsystem
 2016-05-19 Lebanon/Beirut Sunflower theatre, Springs Festival
 2016-05-21 Tunisia/Tunis Hamra theatre, Springs Festival
 2016-05-25 Switzerland/Geneva
 2016-05-26 Switzerland/Bern ONO
 2016-05-29 Switzerland/Zurich Moods
 2016-07-24 France/Nasbinals dans le cadre du festival
 2016-09-24 France/Paris Institut du Monde Arabe

Awards 
 RMC Radio Monticarlo, music arrangements 2006

Discography 
 2008 Khameer
 2012 Asia
 2016 The Queen of Turquoise

Film scores 
 Roubama (2012), directed by Rakan Mayassi (Jordan). Feature film selection by Locarno Film Festival, Beirut International Film Festival 
 Bb (2012) directed by Lamis Al Mouhammad (Syria)

References 

1981 births
Living people
People from Aleppo
Syrian saxophonists
21st-century saxophonists